The 2022 African U-20 Women's World Cup Qualifying Tournament was the 11th edition of the African U-20 Women's World Cup Qualifying Tournament, the biennial international youth football competition organised by the Confederation of African Football (CAF) to determine which women's under-20 national teams from Africa qualify for the FIFA U-20 Women's World Cup. Players born on or after 1 January 2002 were eligible to compete in the tournament.

Two teams could qualify from this tournament for the 2022 FIFA U-20 Women's World Cup (originally 2020 but postponed due to COVID-19 pandemic) in Costa Rica as the CAF representatives.

Draw 
A total of 40 (out of 54) CAF member national teams entered the qualifying rounds. The draw was held on 10 May 2021 at the CAF headquarters in Cairo, Egypt. 

In the first round, the 16 teams were drawn into 8 ties, with teams divided into five pots based on their geographical zones and those in the same pot drawn to play against each other.
In the second round, the 8 first round winners and the 24 teams receiving byes to the second round were allocated into 16 ties based on the first round tie numbers, with eight first round winners playing against the eight teams receiving byes, and the other 16 first round winners playing against each other.
In the third round, the 16 second round winners were allocated into eight ties based on the second round tie numbers.
In the fourth round, the eight third round winners were allocated into four ties based on the third round tie numbers.
In the fifth round, the four fourth round winners were allocated into two ties based on the fourth round tie numbers

Table 

Notes
Teams in bold qualified for the final tournament.
(W): Withdrew after draw

Did not enter

Format
Qualification ties were played on a home-and-away two-legged basis. If the aggregate score was tied after the second leg, the away goals rule would be applied, and if still tied, the penalty shoot-out (no extra time) would be used to determine the winner.

Schedule

First round

|}

Eritrea won 6–1 on aggregate.

Mozambique won 2–0 on aggregate.

Benin won 13–2 on aggregate.

DR Congo won 9–1 on aggregate.

Second round

|}

Tanzania won 5–0 on aggregate.

Burundi won 5–0 on aggregate.

Botswana won 8–1 on aggregate.

Ethiopia won 8–0 on aggregate.

Uganda won 10–3 on aggregate.

South Africa won 4–2 on aggregate.

Zambia won 8–1 on aggregate.

Morocco won 4–3 on aggregate.

1–1 on aggregate. Gambia won 4–3 on penalties.

Senegal won 5–3 on aggregate.

1–1 on aggregate. Guinea won 3–2 on penalties.

Cameroon won 9–0 on aggregate.

Congo won 4–2 on aggregate.

Nigeria won 11–0 on aggregate.

Third round

|}

Tanzania won 4–3 on aggregate.

Ethiopia won 8–2 on aggregate.

Uganda won 1–0 on aggregate.

Ghana won 1–0 on aggregate.

Morocco won 9–1 on aggregate.

3–3 on aggregate. Senegal won on away goals.

 

Nigeria won on walkover after Congo withdrew from the second leg in Nigeria.

Fourth round

|}

Ethiopia won 2–1 on aggregate.

Ghana won 7–1 on aggregate.

2–2 on aggregate. Senegal won 5–4 on penalties.

Nigeria won 3–0 on aggregate.

Fifth round

|}

Ghana won 5–1 on aggregate.

Nigeria won 7–2 on aggregate.

Qualified teams for FIFA U-20 Women's World Cup
The following two teams from CAF qualified for the 2022 FIFA U-20 Women's World Cup.

1 Bold indicates champions for that year. Italic indicates hosts for that year.

Goalscorers

See also 

2022 Africa Women Cup of Nations
2022 African U-17 Women's World Cup Qualifying Tournament

References 

2022
Women's U-20 World Cup Qualifying Tournament
African U-20 World Cup Qualifying Tournament
2022 in youth association football
2022 FIFA U-20 Women's World Cup qualification